José Hipólito Unanue y Pavón (August 13, 1755–July 15, 1833) was a physician, naturalist, meteorologist, cosmographer, the first Minister of Finance of Peru, Minister of Foreign affairs, Protomédico (equivalent to Minister of health combines with head of "Escuela de Medicina del Peru"), university professor, founder of the San Fernando Medical School (now the Medicine faculty of San Marcos University), representative of Arequipa in the Cortes of Cádiz, President of the Junta de Gobierno (highest executive power in the Peruvian government at that time), Protector of the province of Arequipa (during the Spanish Empire), independence precursor and a Peruvian politician, active in politics in the early years after independence. He served as the President of the Congress from 1822 to 1823.

Early life
Hipólito Unanue was born in Arica on August 13, 1755 as the son of Antonio Unánue de Montalivert
and Manuela Pavón y Salgado, both from creole families. He studied philosophy and law in a seminary in Arequipa. In 1777, Unanue moved to Lima to study natural sciences. He studied in Universidad Nacional Mayor de San Marcos where he received his bachelor's degree in 1783, graduated in 1786 and became a professor at the same university, establishing his name as an eminent physician. He was one of the founders of Sociedad Académica de Amantes del País in 1790.

Unanue was Minister of Finance of Peru on three times: 1821-1823, 1823-1824 and 1824-1825. His contributions to Peruvian science were "largely forgotten," during the turbulent period of Peruvian independence.

See also
Spanish American Enlightenment

References

1755 births
1833 deaths
Presidents of Peru
Presidents of the Congress of the Republic of Peru
Peruvian people of Spanish descent
Peruvian Ministers of Economy and Finance
19th-century Peruvian physicians
National University of San Marcos alumni
People from Arica
18th-century Peruvian physicians
Freemasons